Michael "Michi" Hayböck (born 5 March 1991) is an Austrian ski jumper.

Career
He took his first World Cup win on 6 January 2015 in Bischofshofen in the final event of the Four Hills Tournament 2014/15. He is a junior world champion from Hinterzarten 2010.

Hayböck competed for Austria in both individual men's ski jumping events at the 2014 Winter Olympics in Sochi, Russia. He qualified for the finals in both events and placed 5th in the normal hill competition and 8th in the large hill. Then as part of the Austrian team along with Thomas Morgenstern, Thomas Diethart and Gregor Schlierenzauer he took a silver in the team large hill competition at the same games.

At the Nordic World Ski Championships 2017 in Lahti, he won together with Stefan Kraft, Daniela Iraschko-Stolz, and Jacqueline Seifriedsberger the silver medal in the mixed team competition. In the men's team competition he won bronze together with Stefan Kraft, Manuel Fettner, and Gregor Schlierenzauer.

World Cup

Standings

Wins

Individual starts (235)

References

External links

1991 births
Austrian male ski jumpers
Living people
Olympic ski jumpers of Austria
Ski jumpers at the 2014 Winter Olympics
Ski jumpers at the 2018 Winter Olympics
Olympic silver medalists for Austria
Olympic medalists in ski jumping
Medalists at the 2014 Winter Olympics
Sportspeople from Linz
FIS Nordic World Ski Championships medalists in ski jumping
21st-century Austrian people